The Surface to Air Missile for Assured Retaliation , or SAMAR is a quick reaction surface-to-air missile system. SAMAR has been developed by IAF’s 7 Base Repair Depot (BRD) and 11 BRD in partnership with Simran Flowtech Industries and Yamazuki Denki.

SAMAR is a short range air defence system using Russian origin Vympel R-73 and R-27 air to air missiles.

Indian Air Force (IAF) Base Repair Depot (BRD) developed the
Surface Air Missile for Assured Retaliation (SAMAR) Air Defence system that is made up of refurbished Russian- supplied Vympel R-73E infrared?guided air-to-air missiles (AAMs) reprogrammed to be used as a Surface to Air short range Air Defence system has been cleared for Induction.

SAMAR Air Defence system that was showcased at the Aero India 2023 has completed all firing trials and has a range of 12km against low-level flying aerial targets from UAVs, Helicopters and fighter jets.

IAF has an inventory of thousands of Vympel R-73E that have completed their flight shelf life and no longer can be safe to be used on fighter jets but are perfect to be used in a new role as a Short-ranged Air Defence system.

References 

Indian Air Force
Surface-to-air missiles of India